Josep Fornas Martínez (19 October 1924 – 4 January 2021) was a Spanish politician who served in the Parliament of Catalonia.

References

1924 births
2021 deaths
Spanish politicians